TV 2 Group (Norwegian: TV 2 Gruppen) is Norway's largest commercial media company. TV 2 Group provides services for TV, Teletext, radio, Internet, Web TV, broadband-TV, mobile telephones and other information formats.

The company owns TV 2, TV 2 Zebra, TV 2 Livsstil, TV 2 Nyheter, TV 2 Sport, TV 2 Sport Premium, TV 2 Play.

References

External links
 TV 2 Gruppen

TV 2 (Norway)
Television broadcasting companies of Norway
Norwegian companies established in 1991
Mass media companies established in 1991
Companies based in Bergen
European Broadcasting Union members
Television companies of Norway